The Hamilton Street Railway commonly known as the HSR is a public transport agency in Hamilton, Ontario, Canada. The name is a legacy of the company's early period, when public transit in Hamilton was primarily served by streetcars. Although streetcars are no longer used in the city today, the HSR operates bus and paratransit services, with a ridership of 21 million passengers a year. The HSR uses the Presto card as its method of fare payment, allowing for connections with GO Transit and other transit systems in the Greater Toronto area.

History

Ownership

In 1873, the HSR was created and owned by Lyman Moore and operated as a private business under a city franchise. In 1899, HSR was bought out by the Hamilton Cataract, Power, Light and Traction Company, later known as Dominion Power and Transmission Company. In April 1930, HSR was acquired by Ontario Hydro. Provincial ownership ended in 1946 when HSR became a subsidiary of Canada Coach Lines. Through a corporate reorganization in 1954, CCL became a subsidiary of HSR. HSR and CCL were purchased by the city of Hamilton in 1960. CCL was sold to Trentway-Wagar in 1993. Hamilton-Wentworth Region began ownership of HSR in 1977, and in 2001 regional amalgamation placed ownership back to the city of Hamilton.

Former streetcar system

The HSR operated horsecars from 1874 to 1892 and electric streetcars from 1892 to 1951. Trolley buses replaced streetcars in Hamilton in December 1950 and 1951.

Former interurban lines
Hamilton had four interurban lines originating from downtown Hamilton. These lines were not part of the HSR but for many of their years of operation had the same parent company, Dominion Power and Transmission Company. In order to access downtown Hamilton, the interurbans shared some trackage with the HSR.

From 1907, interurban cars ran out of a Hamilton Terminal Station located between Main and King Streets East at Catherine Street. The passenger terminal with several tracks was east of Catherine Street and a two-track interurban freight station was on that street's west side. In 1924, buses of Dominion Power subsidiaries started using the terminal, but loaded on Main Street. After interurbans were abandoned, the passenger station was made over for buses. The station closed in 1955, and was later demolished. Today, its site is occupied by Terminal Towers.

Former trolley bus system

Trolley buses were used by the HSR from 1950 to 1992 on the routes listed in the table below. Hamilton's trolley bus system opened on December 10, 1950, and the last day of trolley bus service was December 30, 1992.

Former bus routes
In the early 1990s the HSR eliminated many routes by expanding current routes. The following is a list of replaced and withdrawn routes:

Barns/garages

Former loops 
The following is a list of former bus, trolleybus and streetcar loops:

Services

Bus routes  
Most bus routes in Hamilton operate all of the week, from early morning to late at a night, or past midnight. Headways mostly range from between 6 and 30 minutes, and most routes being 20 minutes or better on weekdays, usually between 12 and 20 minutes frequencies, depending on time of day.

On weekends, frequencies are reduced, and services are usually altered or unavailable on holidays.

There are some special bus routes that only operate during certains times of year, enter Burlington, or otherwise operate in different ways from the majority of routes.

Trans-Cab 
Introduced in 1998 as a two-year pilot project, Trans-Cab is a shared-ride taxi service between HSR and specific local taxi providers, currently offered in portions of Glanbrook and Stoney Creek.

Accessible transportation 
Accessible Transportation Services (ATS) is the section that administers a variety of accessible services on behalf of the City
 Accessible low-floor (ALF) buses provide level entry and exit to accommodate wheelchairs and walkers. It is anticipated that the entire HSR fleet will be accessible by 2009.
 Disabled and Aged Regional Transportation System (DARTS) is a non profit charitable organization that is the paratransit service provider.
 Taxi Scrip program provides discounted taxi coupons for ATS registered persons who are unable to access regular transit buses.

Mountain Climber 

In 2017, HSR launched a program called "Mountain Climber," that allows cyclists ride on the bus to get up and down Hamilton Mountain for free. This program was made permanent in 2018 and has since been expanded to include more stops.

Participating bus stops are located along major roads at the base and crest of the escarpment. People with bicycles load them onto the bus' front rack, and when boarding, tell the bus operator they are riding under Mountain Climber for free. The routes are very limited in length, and provide a safe way for cyclists to ascend or descend the mountain, in order to encourage active transportation.

Rapid transit 

Metrolinx, the provincial public transit agency, is planning a  light rail line along the Main/King corridor from McMaster University to Eastgate Square. The line will have 17 stops. Previously known as the B-Line, it is one of five BRT/LRT lines originating from the BLAST network proposal, and the only one in active planning. , the operator of the future line is unknown and might not be HSR. For example, Keolis will operate and maintain the Hurontario LRT, another Metrolinx project, even though the local public transit operator in Mississauga is MiWay.

Terminals and connections 
HSR routes from downtown to the Mountain (20, 21, 22, 23, 24, 25, 26, 27, 33, and 35) currently use the Frank A. Cooke Transit Terminal (former MacNab Transit Terminal), while several lower city routes (4, 6, 7, 8 and 9) have an on-street terminal layover at the intersection of Main and James Streets. Route 34 has a layover location on Main at MacNab.

On September 4, 2022, the City of Hamilton renamed the MacNab Transit Terminal to Frank A. Cooke Transit Terminal to honour an employee of the HSR that retired as a general manager and died at the age of 100. The terminal is located at 1 MacNab Street South and was opened in 2011. It serves 10 bus routes with 7,250 weekly arrivals and departures in 2022. The wheelchair accessible terminal has heated platforms, bus shelters, public washrooms and a green roof.

HSR connects with GO Transit at Hamilton GO Centre, which serves as the terminus for four HSR routes (1, 2, 3, and 51). The station, located at 36 Hunter Street East, a few blocks south of King and James, is the terminus of the Lakeshore West railway line and express Highway 407 and Queen Elizabeth Way GO Buses.  It is also the former home of the main Greyhound Lines bus stop, prior to Greyhound Canada's Canada-wide closure in 2021.  It is also the former Toronto, Hamilton and Buffalo Railway (TH&B) passenger station, and there is a small museum above the public concourse. HSR routes 2 and 4 also connect with GO at Barton Street & Nash Road in East Hamilton, where a GO bus travels between there and the Burlington GO Station.

At the Mountain Transit Centre transfer point (served by route 27) and a contract with Blue Line Taxi, the HSR also connects with other areas in the northwest portion of the former Glanbrook.

In addition, the HSR is connected with Burlington Transit, as one route (11 Parkdale) travels into Burlington via Burlington Beach, 18 Waterdown connects with BT at Aldershot GO Station, and BT Route 1 enters downtown Hamilton from Plains Road West. Also '9 Rock Gardens' travels into Burlington going into the Royal Botanical Gardens during the summer months.

Other terminals and loops

Fares

Metrolinx and HSR have partnered to operate the Presto electronic fare card. The project aims to standardize fare collection systems across transit agencies in the Greater Toronto and Hamilton Area. Starting in 2023, riders could tap their credit card on the Presto reader to pay the cash fare amount.

Frequent HSR riders can take advantage of the frequent rider discount program. For any given week (from Monday to Sunday), bus rides after the first 11 trips (8 under the HSR Fare Incentives for Ridership Recovery initiative) will not be charged.

Students of McMaster University, Mohawk College and Redeemer University are eligible to receive a complimentary HSR U-Pass. The U-Pass is loaded onto a Presto card and allows unlimited travel across the entire HSR, with free 2-hour transfers from HSR to other transit agencies in the 905 area.

Paper tickets and monthly passes were discontinued on October 31, 2020. Paper fare medias were accepted until December 31, 2020. All new passes, including the Golden Age Pass, are only available through Presto card.

As a way to incentivize transit usage during the recovery of COVID-19 pandemic, HSR launched HSR Fare Incentives for Ridership Recovery initiative on November 1, 2021. For a limited time, children aged 6–12 with a valid Presto card can ride on HSR for free until April 30, 2023. Number of rides to be eligible for the Presto loyalty program has been reduced from 11 rides per week to 8.

Staff
HSR bus drivers and mechanics (800 employees as of 2019) are members of the Amalgamated Transit Union Local 107. The local does not represent those working on city's paratransit service, Disabled and Aged Regional Transportation System (DARTS), which is a separate, non-profit charitable organization that contracts with HSR.

Gallery

References 

15. Enbridge Gas RNG Bus Trial: http://enbridgegas.mediaroom.com/2021-03-04-Enbridge-Gas-Partners-with-City-of-Hamilton-to-Fuel-Ontarios-First-Carbon-Negative-Bus

External links 
 
 Bus News published by city of Hamilton
 HSR history, Library and Archives Canada
 Hamilton Transit History on TrainWeb
 Transit History of Hamilton: summary of key dates and events

Transit agencies in Ontario
Transport in Hamilton, Ontario
Passenger rail transport in Hamilton, Ontario
Hydro-Electric Railways
Organizations established in 1874
Transit authorities with natural gas buses
Defunct Ontario railways
1874 establishments in Ontario